ESTCube-1 is the first Estonian satellite and first satellite in the world to attempt to use an electric solar wind sail (E-sail). It was launched on 7 May 2013 aboard Vega VV02 carrier rocket  and successfully deployed into orbit. The CubeSat standard for nanosatellites was followed during the engineering of ESTCube-1, resulting in a 10×10×11.35 cm cube, with a volume of 1 liter and a mass of 1.048 kg.

The mission ended officially on 17 February 2015 and it was said that during this time it resulted in 29 bachelor's and 19 master's dissertations, 5 doctoral theses and 4 start-ups. The deployment of the E-sail tether was unsuccessful, and thus no measurements were taken of the E-sail or of the plasma braking deployment system. The last signal from ESTCube-1 was received on 19 May 2015.

Scientific purpose

 
Developed as part of the Estonian Student Satellite Program, ESTCube-1 was an educational project in which university and high school students participated.

While emphasis was placed on educating students during creation of ESTCube-1, it did have a scientific purpose. The satellite carried an electric solar wind sail (E-sail) which was invented by Finnish scientist Pekka Janhunen. During the ESTCube-1 flight, 10 meters of 20–50 micrometer thick E-sail wire, sometimes referred to as "Heytether," were to be deployed from the satellite. The deployment of the Heytether was to be detected by a decrease of the satellite's rotation speed or an onboard camera.

To control the E-sail element's interaction with both the plasma surrounding the Earth and the effect it had on the spacecraft's spinning speed, two nanotechnology electron emitters/guns were on board. The electron emitters were connected to the E-sail element which was to be charged positively to 500 volts by shooting out electrons. The positive ions in the plasma were intended to push the E-sail element and influence the satellite's rotation speed. The effect of the plasma on the E-sail was to be measured by the change in said rotation speed.  The tether had also been intended to de-orbit the satellite by use as a plasma-brake to demonstrate a possibility for returning small satellites from orbit. A color CMOS camera was also on board that was capable of making RAW-format pictures with VGA-resolution. This camera was used to acquire images of Earth and had been intended to monitor deployment of the Heytether.

Orbit
To complete the scientific experiment and communicate with the satellite on several occasions the orbit chosen was a sun–synchronous circular orbit at an altitude of 670 kilometers. ESTCube-1 was launched into orbit by Arianespace, using Vega VV02 rocket which lifted off from ELA-1 at Kourou at 02:06:31 UTC on 7 May 2013.  The satellite was placed into orbit and communication successfully established, with the first photo of the Earth taken on May 15 and transmitted to the ground on the amateur radio band.

Lifespan of the satellite
The plan, beginning with the 7 May 2013 launch, included the following steps: 
Half an hour after the satellite's deployment from the start capsule, the satellite's antennas were deployed and radio transmitter and important subsystems were switched on.
During first 48 hours after the deployment, the satellite sent only safe-mode CW beacon signals.
The first weeks were used to test the satellite and set it to work at full capacity.
Orientation of the satellite so the on-board camera was facing Earth to acquire images of Estonia. That goal was achieved during the project.
Rotation of the satellite on its longitudinal axis with a speed of 1 revolution per second. ESTCube-1 became possibly the fastest controlled rotating satellite in history, reaching angular velocity 841 °/sec.
E-Sail element deployment from the satellite by centrifugal force was attempted in mid-October 2014, however, the deployment failed, possibly due to a stuck reel.  No confirmation of the deployment was received via the on-board camera, and further E-sail experiments were not conducted.
After the failure of E-Sail tether deployment, on-board cold cathode electron emitters were successfully tested.

End of mission
The mission ended due to degradation of the photovoltaic power system and subsequently the batteries became exhausted. The last official transmission was transmitted on 17 February 2015, however, imaging the Earth and gathering environmental data continued till May 19, 2015.  The plan to test a solar sail the satellite carried failed since the sail cable unwinding mechanics did not survive the rocket takeoff vibration.

Design

Measurements and weight
During the development of the Estonian satellite mission it was decided to make a 1U CubeSat.
By standard 1 unit (1U) CubeSat base side length must be 100.0±0.1 millimeters and satellite height must be 113.5±0.1 mm.
Mass is also set in CubeSat standard, the highest possible mass for 1U CubeSat is 1300 grams.

Communications
Communication from the satellite was made at two International Amateur Radio Unions registered frequencies
437.250 MHz
437.505 MHz

Periodic but very slow communication was made by using 18 WPM telegraphy signal on a frequency of 437.250 MHz. At that frequency, the most important satellite parameters are returned every 3 to 10 minutes. For fast connections FSK-modulation radio signals on a frequency of 437.505 MHz with a 9600 baud connection speed and AX.25 packet standard is used. The relatively slow connection speeds result from the use of amateur radio frequencies which limits the bandwidth to 25 kilohertz. The fast connection is used only when the satellite has been given a specific order. Both telegraphy and packet telemetry protocols of ESTCube-1 are published on project webpage.

Commands sent to the satellite used the 145 MHz (2 meter) amateur band.

Software
ESTCube-1 microcontrollers use the following operating systems:
 FreeRTOS on the satellite's Command and Data Handling System and camera module.
 TinyOS on the satellite's communication module. (Typically used with devices running on low power)

Mission Control System is currently being developed by the students of Tartu University under the supervision of the company CGI Group.

Financing and costs

ESTCube-1 was launched as a secondary payload onboard Vega flight VV02, the least expensive satellite launch offered by the European Space Agency. Because Estonia is an associated member of ESA, most of the launch expenses (about 70,000 euros) were covered by the Estonian member fee for educational expenses. With the launch, total expenses for the project were approximately 100,000 euros.

Results

The satellite successfully demonstrated the operation of the systems in space, with a two-year operational life.  The deployment of the E-sail was unsuccessful, and no measurements were taken of the E-sail or of the plasma braking deployment system.

See also

 ESTCube-2
 Aalto-1 – Finnish Aalto university nanosatellite project
 CubeSat
 List of CubeSats
 Space science in Estonia

References

External links

ESTcube-1 original homepage
ESTcube-1 homepage 
Tartu Observatory homepage
ESTCube-1 details on eoPortal site
AMSAT UK overview on ESTcube-1
E-sail – Electric solar wind sail website
CubeSat "Home"
Andrew Bodrov Panorama Presentation of the first Estonia's satellite ESTCube-1
ESTCube-1 mentioned in New Scientist

Videos
 Erik, ESTCube-1 at YouTube
 Estonian Student Satellite Program ESTCube-1 – Urmas Kvell – University of Tartu
 Estonian Public Broadcasting – Eesti esimene satelliit alustab täna teekonda kosmosesadamasse
 Estonian Public Broadcasting – Eesti esimene satelliit alustab täna teekonda kosmosesadamasse

Student satellites
CubeSats
First artificial satellites of a country
2013 in Estonia
Spacecraft launched in 2013
Solar sail spacecraft
Satellites orbiting Earth
Science and technology in Estonia
Spacecraft launched by Vega rockets